Ab Rizak (also Romanized as Āb Rīzaḵ; also known as Abrizak) is a village in Chamsangar Rural District, Papi District, Khorramabad County, Lorestan Province, Iran. At the 2006 census, its population was 67, in 13 families.

References 

Towns and villages in Khorramabad County